This is a tally of newspaper and magazine endorsements in the 2008 Canadian federal election:

Endorsing the Conservatives

Endorsing the Liberals

Endorsing the Bloc Québécois

Endorsing the New Democratic Party

Endorsing multiple parties

Explicitly endorsing no party

Notes and references 

2008 Canadian federal election
Canada 2008